Thomas Lee Bahler (also spelled Bähler; born June 1, 1943) is an American singer, composer, songwriter, arranger, producer, and author. He is the younger brother of singer, arranger, conductor and composer John Bahler. Bahler is most known for his song "She's Out of My Life"; recorded by Michael Jackson, the song was originally written for Frank Sinatra, who never recorded it.

In Bahler's early career, he worked with Jan Berry (of Jan and Dean). Later, he and his elder brother John were vocalists in the Ron Hicklin Singers. Together with the Wrecking Crew, the Bahler brothers have sung, produced, and arranged hundreds of worldwide hits. They were the featured background voices on The Partridge Family recordings in the 1970s.

The Love Generation
John and Tom Bahler tried their hands with their own band The Love Generation which was not a great success. They made three records as a band. The last record, "Montage", is considered to be a project just by John and Tom. As session vocalists for The Partridge Family the brothers re-recorded the Screen Gems-published song "Let the Good Times In" for the series' pilot episode, which they had originally recorded for their debut "Love Generation" album in a slightly different arrangement. The Partridge version of the song remained a heavily sought after unreleased track until it appeared officially for the first time ever on the group's "The Very Best Of" CD which was released in 2005.

The Going Thing
After "The Love Generation", John and Tom joined The Going Thing, a band which was devised by the advertising agency J. Walter Thompson (now known as JWT), to promote the products of the Ford Motor Company. Tom appeared on Ford's 1969 "Going Thing" television commercial.

Later career
Bahler wrote the Bobby Sherman hit "Julie, Do Ya Love Me" (1970), and also Cher's 1972 hit "Living in a House Divided".  "She's Out Of My Life", recorded by Michael Jackson and other artists, was written by Bahler in 1979. It has been claimed he wrote "She's Out Of My Life" about Karen Carpenter, who broke up with Bahler after discovering he had fathered a child with another woman, but Bahler says the song was written about Rhonda Rivera. In 1985, he was the associate producer for the Grammy Award winning "We Are the World", which he considers his most significant project.

Bahler is an associate of Quincy Jones. He has also worked with B. J. Thomas, Neil Diamond, Sonny & Cher, David Cassidy, Billy Joel and Michael Jackson.

For television and film, Bahler has produced the music for the Miss USA, Miss Teen USA and Miss Universe Pageant, for a number of years and he composed the music to a number of movies and scored a number of soundtracks. He made cameo appearances in movies such as Wag The Dog, also composing the song, "The American Dream" for the film.

Books

References

External links
An interview with Tom Bahler
Another page on Tom Bähler

1943 births
Living people
American male singer-songwriters
People from Inglewood, California
Singer-songwriters from California